Homalin Township  is a township in Hkamti District in the Sagaing Region of Burma. The principal town is Homalin. The principal rivers flowing through the township are the Chindwin River form north to south and the Uyu River from east to west, joining the Chindwin near Homalin town.

History
Gardens were first planted along the banks of the Chindwu in Homalin Township around 1700. Several villages such as Tamanthi, Maungkan, Tason, Kawya, Onbet, Maingwe and Malin have been documented as producing pickled tea, known as "laphet".

The 1908 Imperial Gazetteer of India recorded that the steamers of the Irrawaddy Flotilla Company plied weekly between Pakokku and Homalin. Government of Myanmar also plied its launches on this route. During World War II, Homalin on the bank of the Chindwin River, was occupied by the Japanese in late May/early June 1944. Following this, after the Japanese were defeated, the town was combed thoroughly to remove any Japanese soldiers and this was followed by further preparations to counter any Japanese gunboat attacks from the river side.

Naga tribes and their subgroups of Angkul, Nauk-aw, Laing Nang, Hyein Myay, Pain Kuu, Para, Makuri, Smmara, Pon Myo and Kyan Naga live in Homalin Township, apart from other townships such as the  Khamti Township, Lahe Township, Layshee Township, Tanai Township, Nan Yon Township and Pan Saung of Sagaing Division.

Wildlife

The Tamanthi Wildlife Sanctuary, which was established on April 11, 1974 on the eastern bank of the Chindwin River, forms part of Hkamti and Homalin Townships in Hkamti District of Sagaing Division.

The sanctuary abounds in tigers, elephants, gaur (Asiatic bison), leopards, serow, bear, Sumatran rhinoceros (Didermocherus Sumatrensis) and Javan rhinoceros (Rhinoceros sondaicus). In the past, it was a favourite ground for wildlife hunters and poachers. It is also reported to be home for were-tigers, known in Europe as the European werewolf. Other fauna found here are the white-winged wood duck and masked fin foot. Over all, 30 species of mammals, including the endangered species of Roofed turtle are found here.

Towns and villages
Towns and villages in Homalin include Awthaw, Awthaw, Chaunggan, Chaungson, Chaungzon, Dokthida, Gwedaukkon, Gwegyi,  Gwegyi, Gyobin, Hehkam, Hepet, Hkodaung, Hkomi, Hkonsa, Hmangin, Hmawyonmyaing, Homalin, Hpacheleik, Hpanaing, Htawng-u, Htedanshi, Htingu, Htonmalut, Hulaung, Hunawng, Hunawng, Hupet, Hwebalan, Hwein, Hwekyin,  Hwemate, Hwena, Hwepanan, Ingyintha, Intha, Kadaungbwin, Kanbawng, Kaukngo, Kawngkan, Kawngkan, Kawngkankyun, Kawya, Kettha, Kodaungma, Kondan, Kondan, Kondan, Kuntawng, Kwenan, Kyaingkyaing, Kyaukkwe, Kyawngon, Kyebin, Kyizu, Kyun-u, Lawngmin, Lawngpawng, Letagawng, Letpantha, Letsaunggan, Magyibin, Maingdaung, Maingkaing, Maingwe, Makaukpat, Mala, Malin, Malon, Manawtha, Man Huna, Man Kin, Manlinta, Manmaw, Man Maw, Man Maw, Manpa,  Mansein, Mansein, Manthe, Man Thet, Mantonhe, Masein, Maungkan, Meng-u, Metkalet, Mezali, Minbwe, Minyagon, Molin, Mongkun, Mong Tawng, Monkali, Myaingtha, Myaukkon, Myauk-ywa, Myene, Myenga, Myintha, Namalin, Namamo,  Namaw, Namchaw, Namheinkaw, Namhka, Namhkam, Namhkansi, Namhon, Namhpanwaik, Namhta, Namkut, Namlit, Nammaw, Nammonggwe, Nammu, Nammun, Nampagan, Nampahok, Nampangon, Nampethka, Namponbon, Nampwehlaing, Namset, Namtalan, Namttaw, Namtaungkyin, Na-nauk, Nankaung, Nansabi, Nantat, Nanthabaik, Nanthanyit, Na-ta-kyaik, Nathe, Natnan, Naunghto-ngo, Naungkatiat, Naungmon, Naungpin, Naungpin, Naungtaw, Naungyin, Nawngbamu, Nawnghena, Nawnghkam, Nawnghkun, Nawngkauk, Nawngke, Nawnglun, Nawngmawn, Nawngpang, Nawngpat, Nawngpu-awng, Nawngpuse, Nawngsankyin, Nawngsansaing, Nawngse, Nawngshu, Nawngtaw, Ngauksa, Ngobin, Nonpala, Nwenaing, Nyaungbintha, Nyaunggon, Obokadauk, Onbet, Onbinhin, Padaung, Pahok, Pamalon, Pamun, Panghkok, Panghpahpa, Panghta, Pangshwehlaw, Paukka, Paybin, Payit, Pebin, Pegon, Pehkwin, Peinhnegon, Petkala, Pinma, Pinnoksut, Pinpalu, Poktho, Saguzwe, Sahpe, Saingkun, Saingkyu, Saingme, Sankat, Sankyein, Satkaya, Sauksaik, Sawpaga, Sayetkon, Sedaw, Shwedwin, Shwetagun, Sinlamaung, Sinnga, Sitsawk, Sutle, Swekawngaw, Tabaw, Taikat, Talaunggyaung, Tamanthi, Tapan, Tape, Tason, Tatkon, Taungbola, Taungdaw, Taungni-chinywa, Taung-ywa, Tawngbohla, Tawnglin, Tawng-ywa, Tawzi, Teinkin, Teinmata, Tetkon, Thabigon, Thapangaing,  Thapanzeik, Thaungdut, Thawun, Thayagon, Thayagon, Thetkedawng,  Thitseikkon, Thugyizu, Tilawng, Tonbawdi, Tonhe, Tonleik, Tonlon, Tonlonhupang, Tonmahe, Tonmakeng, Tonmalaw, Tonmate, Tonmatet, Tonmenan, Tonpin, Tonsaga, Tonsahka, Tonzi, Twetwa, Twetwa, Wetka, Yalagaung, Yaza, Yebawmi, Yegyanzin, Yegyaw, Yele, Yele, Yethpa, Ywadanshe,  Ywathit,  Zedizeik and Zibyugon.

Languages
Somra language
Makury language
Tai Laing language

Festivals
The most famous festival celebrated in the Homalin Township, which is largely inhabited by Naga tribals, is the Kaibi New Year festival on 15 January every year, which is a festival common to all Naga tribals of the entire region. Other festivals by the community are the new housing ceremony, harvesting ceremony and the spiritual worship ceremony.

References

 
Townships of Sagaing Region